Alexander James McDonald (30 August 1882 – 21 August 1942) was an Australian rules footballer who played for the Melbourne Football Club in the Victorian Football League (VFL).

After his one game with Melbourne, McDonald transferred to West Melbourne in the Victorian Football Association (VFA).

Notes

External links 

Demonwiki profile
Alec McDonald's playing statistics from The VFA Project

1882 births
1942 deaths
Australian rules footballers from Bendigo
Melbourne Football Club players
West Melbourne Football Club players